Polyptichites is the perisphictacean ammonite genus from the Lower Cretaceous of Russia.  The shell is subinvolute and coarsely ribbed; ribs bifurcate or trifurcate mid or low on the flanks and cross over the rounded venter. The umbilicus is relatively small and deep. Outer whorls partially envelop the previous leaving a fairly deeply impressed dorsum.

References
Polyptichites, jsdammonites.fr 

Cretaceous ammonites
Ammonitida
Fossils of Russia
Valanginian life